Glovision Inc. (グロービジョン株式会社 Gurōbijon Kabushiki-Gaisha) is a Japanese post-production company, that subtitles, dubs and post produces foreign Television dramas and films, mainly the work of animation dubbing and DVD production work. They also dub character voices in Japanese for foreign video games that were originally developed outside Japan, for the releases of the region's market. Its major shareholder is Kadokawa Shoten.

History

Glovision was founded on August 8, 1963. Foreign drama and documentary programming dubbed foreign films in Japanese, and also while working on subtitling, audio-visual studio operates.
National cartoon Sazae-san, including foreign drama was also a monument of the Columbo series, hit movies in recent years, mainly teenagers explosive worldwide like the Twilight film series, Korean drama's Jewel in the Palace, Blockbuster and Lee San in charge of dubbing and subtitling services for animation and a number of foreign works.
In 2000 a subsidiary of Kadokawa Holdings known as Kadokawa Gerald Pictures Inc. was founded, taken under the 2005 banner and then changed its name to Kadokawa Herald Pictures, through the integration of Kadokawa Pictures subsequently changed its name, it was merged with Kadokawa Pictures in January 2011, and has become a wholly owned subsidiary of Kadokawa Shoten.

External links
 (in Japanese)

Entertainment companies of Japan
Film production companies of Japan
Japanese companies established in 1963
Japanese dubbing studios
Kadokawa Corporation subsidiaries
Mass media companies based in Tokyo
Mass media companies established in 1963
Television and film post-production companies